Gideon Asante (born 28 February 1992) is a Ghanaian footballer who plays as a midfielder or forward for Spanish club Independiente de Ceutí.

Career

College and amateur
Asante played four years of college soccer at Old Dominion University between 2010 and 2013.

While at college, Asante played with USL PDL club Indiana Invaders in 2011.

Professional career
Asante signed with USL Pro club Charlotte Eagles in August 2014 and made his professional debut in a 2–1 loss against Richmond Kickers on 10 August.

References

1992 births
Living people
Ghanaian footballers
Ghanaian expatriate footballers
Old Dominion Monarchs men's soccer players
Indiana Invaders players
Southern West Virginia King's Warriors players
Charlotte Eagles players
Association football midfielders
Expatriate soccer players in the United States
USL League Two players
USL Championship players
People from Sunyani District